Thyrocopa elikapekae is a moth of the family Xyloryctidae. It was first described by Matthew J. Medeiros in 2009. It is endemic to the Hawaiian island of Kauai.

The length of the forewings is 9–12 mm. Adults are on wing from at least April to October. The forewing ground color is rich metallic rust brown. There are one to three very small black spots in the cell and sometimes a few black scales scattered throughout and sometimes black scales concentrated near the proximal end of costal margin and along termen. The hindwing is light brown with bit of orangish brown and brown along the termen and anal margin. The fringe is light brown.

Etymology
The species is named in memory of the mother of the scientist who named the species. Elikapeka is a Hawaiian form of her middle name.

External links

Thyrocopa
Endemic moths of Hawaii
Moths described in 2009